The Ceasars is a group of three Italian music producers: Paolo "Ceasar" Catoni, Marco "PStarr" Pistella and Francesco Rigon.

History
The team was originally known (until 2012) as Ceasars Productions and their production is divided between Italy and United States.

In United States they have cooperated with various Hip hop artists as Styles P, B.G. and Jadakiss, or R&B artists as Avery Storm.
In 2014 Avery Storm's EP “Audiobiography”, featuring Jadakiss, Styles P and N.O.R.E. was released.

In 2013 with "Red Line" they started a project with New York-based singer and songwriter Michael Brunnock (winner of the 2012 David di Donatello Award as performer of the soundtrack composed by David Byrne of Talking Heads for the movie This Must Be the Place by Paolo Sorrentino).

In Italy they have produced music for a variety of major artists including Baby K, Guè Pequeno, Gemitaiz, Ghemon and others.

In 2011, together with Italian rapper Amir, they composed the original soundtrack of Scialla! (Stai sereno) the most awarded Italian film in 2011 directed by Francesco Bruni and shot in Rome. The twelve tracks were published by EMI Music Publishing Italy and the official videoclip of the movie directed by Gianluca Catania won the 2012 Roma Videoclip Award. For this movie The Ceasars were also nominated for the 2012 David di Donatello and Nastro d'Argento (silver ribbons) and won the 2012 Premio Cinema Giovane for the best original soundtrack.

In 2014, together with Michael Brunnock, they created “Peaches and Cream”, title track of the movie Noi 4 directed by Francesco Bruni.

In 2016 they produced the soundtrack of #Twerkumentary, the documentary about Twerking directed by Diana Manfredi (aka Spaghetto)

Discography

Production USA

Production ITALY (part of) 
2008
Amir – "Non Sono Un Immigrato"
Amir – "Questa è Roma 2008"
Amir – "Siamo Liberi" feat. Bassi Maestro

2009
Amir – "Dimmi Di Si" feat. Daniele Vit
Amir – "Requiem for a Gangsta" feat. Prince, Howie
PStarr – "Solo A Te" feat. Tormento

2010
Dirty Mo' – "Lights, Camera, Action" feat. Smif-N-Wessun

2011
Joice – "Rivincita" feat. Luchè, Soul Poetry
 The Ceasars & Amir – Scialla! – original movie soundtrack published by EMI Publishing Italy

 FRancesco Rigon – Le onde
 Amir – La parte del figlio
 Amir – Scialla
 FRancesco Rigon – Mr. Slide
 Amir – Questa è Roma
 Ceasar & PStarr – Pool party
 Ceasar Productions – Macchina gialla
 Amir – La strada parla
 Ceasar & PStarr – Discoteque
 Ceasar & PStarr – Scialla variazioni sul tema
 FRancesco Rigon – Il gatto e la pioggia
 Amir – Le ali per volare

2012
Amir – "Inossidabile Pt. 2" 
Ceasar – "Miura P400 (1968)"
Ghemon – "PTS Pt. 2"
Johnny Marsiglia – "Voci – Remix" feat. Louis Dee, Zuli

2013
Baby K  – "Tutto Ritorna" (produced by Michele Canova & The Ceasars)
 Michael Brunnock – "Red Line"
Gemitaiz – "Collier"
Gemitaiz – "Forever True" feat.  Bassi Maestro, Ensi
Gemitaiz – "Winners & Losers" feat. Sercho
Guè Pequeno – "Amore O Soldi 2013" feat. Daniele Vit
FRancesco Rigon – "La vera storia de La Bella e La Bestia" (musical play) 
FRancesco Rigon – "Provaci ancora Pinocchio" (musical comedy)

2015
Moreno – “Incredibile”
Clementino - "Lo strano caso di Iena White", "Boom" feat. Guè Pequeno and Fabri Fibra
Guè Pequeno - "Equilibrio"

See also
 Italian hip hop

References

External links
  INTERNET MOVIE DATABASE/The Ceasars
  "Red Line" on VANITY FAIR Italia

Record production trios
Songwriting teams
Italian record producers
Italian musical trios
Musical groups established in 2007